The French Atlantic Affair is a novel by Ernest Lehman which was published in 1977. A 3-part TV miniseries based on the book was produced and broadcast in 1979.

Plot
A luxury ocean liner, the SS Marseilles of the French Atlantic Line, is hijacked by Father Dunleavy, a messianic priest, and his cult followers for a $70 million ransom in gold. Harold Columbine, a novelist, and Charles Girodt, the ship's captain, attempt to save the lives of the passengers, some of whom are also members of the group.

Two young amateur radio enthusiasts are the only link between the ship and the outside world. The SS Marseilles was based on the ocean liner SS France (1961) of the French Line.

In the novel, the hijackers were a group of employees laid off by NASA and its contractors after the termination of the Apollo program. The amateur radio operators were a passenger (not a member of the terrorist group), and his on-shore friend, both of whom were physicians.

Cast

 Jean-Pierre Aumont: Chief Jean-Claude Raffin
 Horst Buchholz: Dr. Chabot
 James Coco: George Sauvinage
 Chad Everett: Harold Columbine
 José Ferrer: President Aristide Brouchard
 John Houseman: Dr. Archady Clemens
 Carolyn Jones: Peg
 Richard Jordan: Julian Wunderlicht
 Louis Jourdan: Captain Charles Girodt
 Michelle Phillips: Jennie Barber
 Marie-France Pisier: Lisa
 Donald Pleasence: Max Dechambre
 John Rubinstein: Herb Kleinfeld
 Telly Savalas: Father Dunleavy
 Stella Stevens: Louise Crawford
 Shelley Winters: Helen Wabash
 Lance LeGault: Lester Foyles 
 William Lucking: Don Crawford 
 Nehemiah Persoff: Col. Schreiner 
 Dane Clark: Admiral J. Elton Knox 
 Richard Anderson: Terrence Crown 
 Corinne Calvet: Madame Brouchard
 Harvey Jason: Plessier 
 Dana Hill: Maggie Joy
 Army Archerd: Stanford Whitman
 M. Emmet Walsh: Harry
 Arielle Dombasle: Hotel Operator
 Roger Til: Devillaine
 James Jeter: Al

Production
Exteriors and scenes on deck in the miniseries were shot in the Caribbean aboard Carnival Cruise Lines's SS Festivale. The liner retained its name and markings in the series, though it was said to be owned by the fictional French Atlantic Line.  The vessel in the novel is called the SS Marseilles and is based upon the French Line's SS France.  Interiors were shot on soundstages and in Long Beach, California aboard the RMS Queen Mary.  The film also shot on location in Paris and surrounding areas.

Literature
 Ernest Lehmann: The French Atlantic Affair Atheneum, New York 1977,

References
 "something in the creative process has gone badly awry with this ungainly, pedestrian, not-very-suspense story ..." https://news.google.com/newspapers?nid=1755&dat=19771113&id=UUk0AAAAIBAJ&sjid=X2cEAAAAIBAJ&pg=2331,5050136

External links

American crime novels
1977 American novels
American novels adapted into films
Films about ship hijackings
Films set on cruise ships
Hostage taking in fiction
Atheneum Books books